Artinite is a hydrated basic magnesium carbonate mineral with formula: . It forms white silky monoclinic prismatic crystals that are often in radial arrays or encrustations. It has a Mohs hardness of 2.5 and a specific gravity of 2. 

It occurs in low-temperature hydrothermal veins and in serpentinized ultramafic rocks. Associated minerals include brucite, hydromagnesite, pyroaurite, chrysotile, aragonite, calcite, dolomite and magnesite.

It was first reported in 1902 in Lombardy, Italy. It was named for Italian mineralogist, Ettore Artini (1866–1928).

References

Magnesium minerals
Carbonate minerals
Hydroxide minerals
Hydrates
Monoclinic minerals
Minerals in space group 12